Maurice Michael Stephens,  (20 October 1919 – 23 September 2004) was a Royal Air Force flying ace of the Second World War. Stephens scored 17 kills, three shared kills, one probable kills and five damaged.

Early life
Born in Ranchi, India on 20 October 1919, the son of John William Stephens, a British Army officer serving with the Lincolnshire Regiment, Stephens was educated at the Xaverian Colleges at Clapham and Mayfield, Sussex. After school he initially joined the Port of London Authority, before going to the Royal Air Force College Cranwell in 1938. At Cranwell he excelled in boxing and rowing and was awarded his wings in 1940.

Second World War
Stephens' first posting was to No. 3 Squadron RAF, with whom he fought during the Battle of France. He became the Flight Commander of B Flight during this battle, while still holding the rank of pilot officer. On his return from France he was awarded the Distinguished Flying Cross (DFC) and Bar, which were gazetted at the same time (and in fact on the same page of the London Gazette):

After the fall of France, B Flight was posted to Scotland and reformed as No. 232 Squadron RAF, of which Stephens was Commanding Officer. No 232 Squadron formed part of No. 13 Group RAF during the Battle of Britain. He was promoted flying officer on 20 August 1940, in the middle of the battle.

Stephens next served North Africa where he joined No. 274 Squadron and was sent to Turkey for eight months, during which he flew operational patrols along the Bulgarian border. He twice intercepted Italian S-84 reconnaissance aircraft intruding across the border, and shot two down in a Turkish Hurricane, while wearing civilian clothes. In November 1941 he returned to the Western Desert to command No. 80 Squadron. He was shot down and wounded in both feet in December 1941, receiving a Distinguished Service Order in January 1942. The citation read:

He then joined No. 229 Squadron flying Spitfires on Malta in October 1942. He was shot down on 12 October and picked up by an air-sea rescue motor launch. In November we became wing commander (flying) at Hal Far airfield. He returned to the UK in 1943 and served in various staff positions, before becoming Chief Flying Instructor at No. 3 Operational Training Unit in January 1944.

Stephens' final score in the war was 15 (and 3 shared) destroyed, 2 unconfirmed destroyed, 1 probable and 5 damaged.

Post-war career and personal life
Stephens continued to serve in the RAF until 1960. After the Second World War he was the first RAF officer to join the newly formed NATO and had staff appointments with Supreme Headquarters Allied Powers Europe and in the Air Ministry, where he was involved in fighter operations.

He joined the Rolls-Royce company soon afterward and based himself in Paris. He retired altogether in 1980 and lived in the south of France, only to return to Britain in 1992.

In 1942 he married Violet May Paterson, always known as "Blue" because she was given a blue ribbon when she was born to identify her from her twin sister; the couple had a son and a daughter.

Photographs of Stephens' medals and damage to his aircraft appeared in the Daily Telegraph in June 2012.

Citations

Bibliography
 Holmes, Tony. Hurricanes Aces 1939–1940. London: Osprey, 1998 .
 Price, Dr. Alfred. Spitfire Mark V Aces 1939–1945. London: Osprey, 1997 .

External links
 Telegraph Obituary
The Times Obituary

1919 births
2004 deaths
British aviators
British World War II flying aces
Companions of the Distinguished Service Order
Graduates of the Royal Air Force College Cranwell
Recipients of the Distinguished Flying Cross (United Kingdom)
Royal Air Force group captains
Royal Air Force pilots of World War II
The Few
British expatriates in France
People from Ranchi